Cross of Love (Finnish: Rakkauden risti) is a 1946 Finnish drama film directed by Teuvo Tulio and starring Regina Linnanheimo, Oscar Tengström and Ville Salminen. The film was shot in parallel with the Swedish-language version Kärlekens kors.

Cast
 Regina Linnanheimo as Riitta  
 Oscar Tengström as Majakka-Kalle  
 Ville Salminen as Mauri Holmberg  
 Rauli Tuomi as Henrik Hormi 
 Pentti Viljanen as Pekka  
 Tuli Arjo as Singer  
 Lauri Korpela as Pilot  
 Hilly Lindqvist as Saara  
 Senja Soitso as Maija 
 Elli Ylimaa as Manageress of the dressmaker's shop

References

Bibliography 
 Qvist, Per Olov & von Bagh, Peter. Guide to the Cinema of Sweden and Finland. Greenwood Publishing Group, 2000.

External links 
 

1946 films
1946 drama films
Finnish drama films
1940s Finnish-language films
Films based on works by Aleksandr Pushkin
Films directed by Teuvo Tulio
Finnish black-and-white films
Finnish multilingual films
1940s multilingual films